Hans Fiederer (21 January 1920 – 15 December 1980) was a German international footballer.

References

1920 births
1980 deaths
Association football forwards
German footballers
Germany international footballers
SpVgg Greuther Fürth players
Sportspeople from Fürth
Footballers from Bavaria